Yang Libing is a former Singaporean Mediacorp actress. She was prominently a full-time artiste from 1983 to 2009.

Career
Yang first entered the entertainment industry during the 1984 after she attended the SBC's drama training course with her older sister Yang Lina. She starred in the long-running hit drama Wok of Life and won the Best Supporting Actress award at the Star Awards 1999. 

Yang left the entertainment industry in 2009 to focus into business and operated a hair salon with her sister Yang Lina which was opened in 2004. 

Yang had appeared in several of MediaCorp's anniversary events and was one of many former artistes present at the Star Awards 2012.

Personal life 
Yang married actor Li Nanxing in 1994 after co-starring with him in several drama series. They divorced in 2004 citing irreconcilable personality differences.

Yang's sister, Yang Lina, died of uterine cancer in 2010.

Filmography

Awards and nominations

References

21st-century Singaporean actresses
20th-century Singaporean actresses
Singaporean television actresses
Singaporean people of Chinese descent
1960s births
Living people